Yafteh is an Upper Paleolithic cave located at the foot of Yafteh Mountain in the Zagros Mountains range, located northwest of Khoramabad in western Zagros, Lorestan Province of western Iran.

Description
Yafteh has yielded the largest number of C14 dates from a single Paleolithic site in Iran that are clustered around 28–35 thousand years ago. A rich collection of ornaments made of marine shells, tooth and hematite has been discovered in the early Upper Paleolithic deposits in both early and recent excavations in the Yafteh cave. This collection was analyzed and published by Sonia Shidrang in the Iranian Journal of Archaeology and History.

Archaeological history
The site was found and later excavated by two American archaeologists, Frank Hole and Kent Flannery, in the 1960s. It contained a thick Upper Paleolithic sequence which yielded  bladelets and tools. A number of C14 dates indicate that the site was occupied mainly between 30 and 35 thousand years ago. Hole and Flannery published some results of their excavation at Yafteh in a general paper about their excavations in prehistoric sites in Loristan and Dehluran.

The lithic assemblages from 1967 excavations were re-analyzed in 2005 by Bordes and Shidrang and later those assemblages were the main subject of a MA thesis in 2007.

The site was re-excavated in 2005 by a joint Belgian-Iranian team directed by Marcel Otte and Fereidoun Biglari and excavated again by Otte and Sonia Shidrang in 2008.

See also
 Baradostian culture

References
 Hole, F., and Flannery, V (1967) The Prehistory of Southwest Iran: A Preliminary Report. Proceedings of the Prehistoric Society 33:147-206
 Otte, M., F. Biglari, D. Flas, S. Shidrang, N. Zwyns, M. Mashkour, R. Naderi, A. Mohaseb N. Hashemi, J. Darvish, & V. Radu (2007) The Aurignacian in the Zagros region: new research at Yafteh Cave, Lorestan, Iran, Antiquity 81:82-96
 Shidrang, S. (2006) The Zagros Aurignacian: The Perspective from Yafteh, Iran. 2006 ASOR Annual Meeting, Abstract Book, p. 34, Philadelphia.
 Shidrang, S. (2007) The Early Upper Paleolithic Ornamental objects from Yafteh Cave and Pa Sangar Rockshelter, Lurestan. Iranian Journal of Archaeology and History 41:38-44. (In Persian, with an English abstract.)
 Shidrang, S. (2007) - The Early Upper Paleolithic lithic assemblages from F15 test pit (2005), Yafteh cave, Iran: A typo-technological study, Master thesis, Universita degli studi di Ferrara, Italy.
 Shidrang S., Otte M., Bordes JG. (2020) Yafteh Cave. In: Smith C. (eds) Encyclopedia of Global Archaeology. Springer, Cham. https://doi.org/10.1007/978-3-030-30018-0_3270

Caves of Iran
Archaeological sites in Iran
Landforms of Lorestan Province
Prehistoric Iran
National works of Iran